Tortillano Tumasis (born 24 July 1934) is a Filipino wrestler. He competed at the 1964 Summer Olympics and the 1968 Summer Olympics.

References

External links
 

1934 births
Living people
Filipino male sport wrestlers
Olympic wrestlers of the Philippines
Wrestlers at the 1964 Summer Olympics
Wrestlers at the 1968 Summer Olympics
Sportspeople from Iloilo City
Wrestlers at the 1958 Asian Games
Asian Games competitors for the Philippines